The Sunderland Talmudical College, popularly known as Sunderland Yeshiva, was founded in the city of Sunderland in the United Kingdom during the 1940s. It re-located to Gateshead in June 1988, albeit keeping its original name, due to the dwindling size of the Jewish community in Sunderland, particularly the orthodox section of the community. In its early years it catered for students from North Africa. In 2021 the student body numbered close to 120. Students are mainly English; however, there are also students from France, Switzerland and Belgium.

Faculty 

The first rosh yeshiva was Rabbi Zusha Waltner. He was succeeded by Rabbi Shammai Zahn, with whom the yeshiva is most closely identified known as av hayeshiva. The other rosh yeshiva Rabbi Zechariah Gelley, later the rabbi of Washington Heights, worked closely with Rabbi Zahn in opening an Ashkenazi wing in the yeshiva. The current rosh yeshiva is Rabbi Yankel Ehrentreu, and the head of kibbutz is Rabbi Avrohom Ehrentreu. The other members of the faculty are R' David Zahn, R' Avrohom Chaim Zahn, R' Yaackov Abenson, R' Shmuel Wolf, R' Moshe Salomon, R' Yechezkel Ehrentreu, R' Shlomo Klyne, R' Yackov Cohen, R' Chaim Roberts, R' Chaim Goldkin, R' Yisreol Meir Hirsch, R' YC Taqqu. R' Nesanel Salamon and R' Mulli Zahn . The day starts with a shiur on Chofetz Chaim, led by Habochur Shuki Hirsch, and originally run by Rabbi Meir Katz.

The Kibbutz 
The Kibbutz is a more recent addition to the yeshiva, having been established in 1996 by Reb Yechezkel Ehrentreu. The head of the Kibbutz, Rabbi Avrohom Ehrentreu is a disciple of Rabbi Chatzkel Levenstein, and is head of the Gateshead Va'ad Horabonim with two other rabbis.

Current location 
Gateshead is a town in Tyne and Wear in North-East England on the south side of the River Tyne opposite Newcastle upon Tyne. It is the main settlement in the Metropolitan Borough of Gateshead.

References

Orthodox Judaism in England
Haredi Judaism in the United Kingdom
Haredi yeshivas
Orthodox yeshivas in the United Kingdom
Educational institutions established in the 1940s
Educational institutions with year of establishment missing